Bettiah Assembly constituency is an assembly constituency in Paschim Champaran district in the Indian state of Bihar.  In 2015 Bihar Legislative Assembly election, Bettiah will be one of the 36 seats to have VVPAT enabled electronic voting machines.

Overview
As per orders of Delimitation of Parliamentary and Assembly constituencies Order, 2008, 8. Bettiah Assembly constituency is composed of the following: Bettiah community development block; and Mohaddipur, Majhaulia, Parsa, Bahuarawa, Gudara, Jaukatia, Bakharia, Rulahi, Rajabhar, Karamawa, Lal Saraiya, Ramnagar Bankat, Amawa Majhar, Majharia Sheikh, Ahawar Kuria, Madhopur, Senuwaria and  Bishambharpur gram panchayats of Majhaulia CD Block.

Bettiah Assembly constituency is part of 2. Paschim Champaran (Lok Sabha constituency). It was earlier part of Bettiah (Lok Sabha constituency).

Members of Vidhan Sabha

Election results

2020

2015

2010

References

External links
 

Assembly constituencies of Bihar
Politics of West Champaran district